Body Double is a 1984 American erotic thriller film directed, co-written, and produced by Brian De Palma. It stars Craig Wasson, Gregg Henry, Melanie Griffith and Deborah Shelton. The film is a direct homage to the 1950s films of Alfred Hitchcock, specifically Rear Window, Vertigo and Dial M for Murder, taking plot lines and themes (such as voyeurism and obsession) from the first two.

At the time of its release, the film received lukewarm success at the box office and mixed reviews, though Melanie Griffith's performance earned praise and brought her a Golden Globe nomination. Subsequently, it has been better received and is now considered to be a cult film.

Plot
Struggling actor Jake Scully has recently lost his role as a vampire in a low-budget horror film after his claustrophobia thwarts shooting. After returning home to discover his girlfriend cheating on him, Scully splits up with her and is left homeless, as the residence belongs to her. At a method acting class, where he meets Sam Bouchard, Scully reveals his fears and the childhood cause of his claustrophobia. They go to a bar where Scully is offered a place to stay; Sam's rich friend has gone on a trip to Europe and needs a house-sitter for his ultra-modern home in the Hollywood Hills.

While touring the house with Scully, Sam is especially enthusiastic about showing him one feature: a telescope, and through it a female neighbor, Gloria Revelle, who erotically dances at a specific time each night. Scully voyeuristically watches Gloria until he sees her being abused by a man she appears to know. The next day, he follows her when she goes shopping. Gloria makes calls to an unknown person who she promises to meet. Scully also notices a disfigured "Indian", a man he had noticed watching Gloria a few days prior. Scully follows Gloria to a seaside motel where she is apparently stood up by the person she was there to meet. On the beach, the Indian suddenly appears and snatches her purse. Scully chases him into a nearby tunnel, but his claustrophobia overcomes him. Gloria walks him out of it, and they impulsively and passionately kiss before she retreats. That night, Scully again is watching through the telescope when the Indian returns and breaks into Gloria's home. Scully races to save Gloria, but her vicious white German Shepherd attacks him, and the Indian murders Gloria with a huge handheld drill.

Scully alerts the police, who rule the murder a botched robbery. However, Detective Jim McLean becomes suspicious after finding a pair of Gloria's panties in Scully's pocket. Although McLean does not arrest him, he tells Scully that his voyeuristic behavior and failure to alert police sooner helped cause Gloria's death. Later that night, suffering from insomnia and watching a pornographic television channel, Scully sees porn actress Holly Body dancing sensually, exactly as Gloria did. In order to meet Holly, he pretends to be a porn producer hiring for a new film.

Scully learns from Holly that Sam hired her to impersonate Gloria each night, dancing in the window, knowing Scully would be watching and later witness the real Gloria's murder. Offended when he suggests she was involved in a killing, Holly storms out of the house. The Indian picks her up, knocks her unconscious and drives away with her. Scully follows them to a reservoir where the Indian is digging a grave. Scully attacks him, and in the scuffle peels his face off to reveal it as a mask worn by Sam. Scully has been set up as a scapegoat by Sam, really Gloria's abusive husband Alex, to provide him with an alibi during the murder. Scully is overpowered and thrown into the grave. Though his claustrophobia initially incapacitates him again, he overcomes his fear and climbs out, and Sam is knocked into the aqueduct by the dog and drowned.

During the ending credits, Scully is shown having been recast in his previous vampire role as Holly watches from the sidelines.

Cast

The film includes appearances from real-life adult performers Linda Shaw, Alexandra Day, Cara Lott, Melissa Scott, Barbara Peckinpaugh and Annette Haven. Steven Bauer, from De Palma's previous film Scarface and Griffith's then-husband, has a cameo as a male porn actor.

Production
After De Palma's successes of Carrie, Dressed to Kill and his remake of Scarface, Columbia Pictures offered him a three-picture deal with Body Double set to be the first.

Scripting
De Palma created the concept of the film after interviewing Angie Dickinson's body doubles for Dressed to Kill. " I started thinking about the whole idea of the body double," he said. "I wondered what I would do if I wanted to make sure to get somebody's attention, to have them looking at a certain place at a certain time." The erotic thriller was also becoming a popular genre to audiences, with the box offices successes of Dressed to Kill and Body Heat. After fighting with censorship boards over the rating of Scarface — they rated it X and he had to battle to make it R — De Palma resolved to make Body Double as pushback. At the time, he said "If this one doesn't get an X, nothing I ever do is going to. This is going to be the most erotic and surprising and thrilling movie I know how to make...I'm going to give them everything they hate and more of it than they've ever seen. They think Scarface was violent? They think my other movies were erotic? Wait until they see Body Double."

Having been impressed with the horror film Blood Bride, De Palma enlisted its director and writer Robert J. Avrech to write the Body Double script with him. Both were fans of Alfred Hitchcock, and screened Rear Window and Vertigo to gather inspiration. Avrech later described his work on the film as "working off of De Palma's ideas of Hitchcock's ideas."

Casting
De Palma initially wanted pornographic actress Annette Haven to play Holly, but she was rejected by the studio due to her pornographic filmography. Nonetheless, Haven did appear in a minor role and consulted with DePalma about the adult film industry. De Palma then offered the role to Linda Hamilton, who declined to begin pre-production on The Terminator. Jamie Lee Curtis, Carrie Fisher, and Tatum O'Neal were considered for the role before Griffith won the role. De Palma later said Haven "was an enormous amount of help" to him in his understanding of the adult film industry and what Holly's background might be, and Griffith brought "a comic edge that I wanted to be a major part of the tone of the second half of the movie." Griffith initially was reluctant to take the role, thinking she "didn't want any more nymphet roles, but now I think I can bring a lot of life to that kind of character...I think I gave her a great amount of intelligence."

De Palma also considered Dutch erotic actress Sylvia Kristel for the role of Gloria, but she was unavailable. Although he cast Shelton, he found her voice to be unsuitable and had her lines dubbed by Helen Shaver in post-production.

Body Double contains a film within a film sequence in which pop band Frankie Goes to Hollywood performs their song "Relax" on the set of a pornographic film, and in which scream queen Brinke Stevens, and adult actresses Cara Lott and Annette Haven appear.  The club scene was converted into a music video and shown on Mtv.  Voice actor Rob Paulsen makes a cameo as a cameraman who utters "Where's the cum shot?".

Production
Principal photography began in Los Angeles on January 30, 1984. Several locations in and around the area were used, including: Tail o' the Pup, the Beverly Center, Barney's Beanery, the LA Farmer's Market, the Rodeo Collection mall on Rodeo Drive, the Spruce Goose dome in Long Beach, the Hollywood Tower and adjacent Hollywood Freeway, Tower Records, and the Chemosphere house.

Post-production
The film was given an X by the Motion Picture Association of America Rating Board. Because many theaters refused to show X-rated films, De Palma had to re-edit the film as he did on Dressed to Kill and Scarface. De Palma cut what he called "a few minor things from the porno movie scene" and got an R. De Palma said the studio did not support the film due to its excessive violence. "Do you think the guys who run Coca-Cola (Columbia Pictures' parent company) want publicity about violence? They are very aware of their public images, and when they start seeing articles in The New York Times about their product and violence, they go crazy. They're not showmen They're corporation types."

Reception

Initial critical response
Body Double debuted to mixed reviews and intense controversy due to its sex and violence. De Palma says that Columbia Pictures executives were at first enthusiastic about the film until it was previewed in Van Nuys. Response from the audience was not strong "and the studio started to get really worried," he said. "The only people crazier than the people who criticize me for violence are the people at the studios. I can't stand that sort of cowardice." De Palma and Columbia mutually agreed to end the three-picture deal.

Roger Ebert praised the film, giving it three and a half out of four stars and calling it "an exhilarating exercise in pure filmmaking, a thriller in the Hitchcock tradition in which there's no particular point except that the hero is flawed, weak, and in terrible danger -- and we identify with him completely." Vincent Canby of The New York Times wrote that De Palma "again goes too far, which is the reason to see it. It's sexy and explicitly crude, entertaining and sometimes very funny. It's his most blatant variation to date on a Hitchcock film (Vertigo), but it's also a De Palma original, a movie that might have offended Hitchcock's wryly avuncular public personality, while appealing to his darker, most private fantasies." Todd McCarthy of Variety stated "To his credit, DePalma moves his camera as beautifully as any director in the business today and on a purely physical level 'Body Double' often proves quite seductive as the camera tracks, swirls, cranes and zooms towards and around the objects of DePalma's usually sinister contemplation. Unfortunately, most of the film consists of visual riffs on Alfred Hitchcock, particularly 'Vertigo' and 'Rear Window.'"

Gene Siskel of the Chicago Tribune gave the film two-and-a-half stars out of four and wrote "When the drill came onto the screen, De Palma lost me and control of his movie. At that point 'Body Double' ceased to be a homage to Hitchcock and instead became a cheap splatter film, and not a very good one at that." Sheila Benson of the Los Angeles Times panned the film as "elaborately empty, silly and desperately derivative," and suggested that De Palma "finally may have exhausted the patience of even his most tenacious admirers." Paul Attanasio of The Washington Post wrote "A lewd, gory, twisty-turny murder mystery swirling around Hollywood's porn industry, 'Body Double' finds Brian De Palma at the zenith of his cinematic virtuosity. The movie has been carefully calculated to offend almost everyone—and probably will. But, like Hitchcock, De Palma makes the audience's reaction the real subject; 'Body Double' is about the dark longings deep inside us."

The film was criticized for its violence towards women. "Women in peril work better in the suspense genre," said De Palma. "It all goes back to the Perils of Pauline...I don’t think morality applies to art. It’s a ludicrous idea. I mean, what is the morality of a still life? I don’t think there’s good or bad fruit in the bowl." A specific scene where a character is killed by a drill was controversial, as many saw it as a sexual image. De Palma said it "was not my intention to create a sexual image with the drill, although it could be construed that way." The London Clinic for Battered Women asked Columbia Pictures for a percentage of the profits from the film, claiming it was "blood money" for using "the victimization of women as a source of massive profit."

Box office
Body Double opened at number three at the box office, earning $2.8 million in its opening weekend. The film earned $8.2 million over its first three weeks, before being pulled in its fourth week. The film earned $8.8 million on a $10 million budget, making it a box office bomb.

Cult reputation and reassessed response
In following decades, Body Double underwent a critical reassessment and developed a cult following; perhaps due to its directorial and aesthetic indulgences, its early 1980s new wave soundtrack, and the use of iconic Los Angeles locations. Review aggregator Rotten Tomatoes reports that 77% of critics have given the film a positive review based on 35 reviews, with an average rating of 6.2/10. The critical consensus reads: "Exemplifying Brian De Palma's filmmaking bravura and polarizing taste, Body Double is a salacious love letter to moviemaking."

Griffith later gave credit to the film and the accolades she garnered for her performance for helping launch her career. The film  helped reintroduce the song "Relax" in America, where it recharted and reached the top 10 of the Billboard Hot 100 in March 1985.

In a 2016 interview with The Guardian, De Palma reflected on the film's initial critical reception, saying "Body Double was reviled when it came out. Reviled. It really hurt. I got slaughtered by the press right at the height of the women’s liberation movement...I thought it was completely unjustified. It was a suspense thriller, and I was always interested in finding new ways to kill people.”

Accolades

In addition, the film's trailer won a Clio Award in 1984.

Cultural impact
The Bret Easton Ellis novel American Psycho repeatedly refers to Body Double as the favorite film of the serial killer Patrick Bateman. He mentions that he has seen the film 37 times and rents the tape of it from a video store several times in the story. He also repeats scenes from the film to the reader or to other characters.

Remake
Body Double was remade in 1993 in India as Pehla Nasha. The film was directed by Ashutosh Gowariker in his directorial debut. Deepak Tijori plays the lead role and the movie features Pooja Bhatt, Raveena Tandon and Paresh Rawal.

See also 

 List of films featuring surveillance
 List of American films of 1984

References

External links
 
 
 
 
 
 
 Body Double at Cinephelia and Beyond

1984 films
1984 thriller films
1980s English-language films
1980s erotic thriller films
1980s mystery thriller films
1980s psychological thriller films
1980s slasher films
American erotic thriller films
American mystery thriller films
American neo-noir films
American psychological thriller films
American slasher films
Columbia Pictures films
Erotic mystery films
Erotic slasher films
Films about actors
Films about pornography
Films directed by Brian De Palma
Films scored by Pino Donaggio
Films set in Los Angeles
Films shot in Los Angeles
1980s American films